Ocnița is a commune in Ocnița District, Moldova. It is composed of two villages, Maiovca and Ocnița.

Gallery

References

Communes of Ocnița District